Tomáš Chalupa (born 3 July 1974) is a Czech politician who served as Minister of the Environment of the Czech Republic from January 2011 to July 2013. He previously served as mayor of Prague 6 from 2002 to 2011.

References

External links

1974 births
Living people
Politicians from Prague
Civic Democratic Party (Czech Republic) MPs
Environment ministers of the Czech Republic
Members of the Chamber of Deputies of the Czech Republic (2010–2013)
Civic Democratic Party (Czech Republic) Government ministers